FC Izhevsk was a Russian football team from Izhevsk. It played professionally from 1946 to 1949 and 1956 to 2004. It played at the second-highest level (Soviet First League and Russian First Division) in 1947–1949, 1956–1962, 1968–1969 and 1992–1993.

Team name history
 1936–1948 Zenit Izhevsk
 1949–1955 Izhevsky Zavod Izhevsk
 1956–1984 Zenit Izhevsk
 1985–1987 Zenit Ustinov (Izhevsk was renamed briefly to Ustinov)
 1988–1998 Zenit Izhevsk
 1998–2003 Dynamo Izhevsk
 2004 FC Izhevsk

External links
  Team history at KLISF

 
Association football clubs established in 1936
Association football clubs disestablished in 2005
Defunct football clubs in Russia
Football clubs in Izhevsk
1936 establishments in Russia
2005 disestablishments in Russia